Rob Oppenheim (born January 12, 1980) is an American professional golfer.

Early and personal life 
Born in Salem, Massachusetts, his parents are Jim and Karen Oppenheim. Oppenheim played for the Andover High School golf team, where he made the all-scholastic team, and also played baseball and basketball for the school. He went on to play for Rollins College (Economics, 2002), where he was also a member of Alpha Mu Delta of Chi Psi.  He lives near Orlando, Florida, with his wife, Lacey, and two children.

Amateur career 
In 1999, he advanced to the round of 16 at the U.S. Amateur at Pebble Beach, California in 1999. While at college he was a four-time All-American in golf and in 2002 won the Player of the Year award for Division II golf. Also in 2002 he led Rollins to the NCAA Division II National Championship. In 2002, he won the Massachusetts Amateur.

Professional career
Oppenheim turned professional in September 2002. Since then, he has played on the Canadian Tour, Cleveland Tour, Hooter's Winter Series, and Moonlight Tour. In 2004, he was the medalist at the first stage of PGA Tour Q-School but fail to earn his card. In 2005, he was the Cleveland Tour leading money winner and New England Pro Tour Player of the Year. In 2006, he finished second on Canadian Tour Order of Merit (money list).

Oppenheim played in two PGA Tour events in the 2006 season, finishing tied for 108th and tied for 41st in the Deutsche Bank Championship and the Bell Canadian Open, respectively. He attempted to enter the PGA Tour in October 2008 in Q School. He came in 27th when the top 23 advance. In 2009 he successfully graduated to the Nationwide Tour, where he played regularly until 2015.

In 2014, he finished only 79th in the Web.com Tour rankings, but then finished 11th at the Web.com Tour Q School to earn a return.  He won his first Web.com Tour tournament in June 2015. Despite his win, Oppenheim missed the cut at the final regular season event and finished 26th on the money list, one spot and $943 short of Harold Varner III, the player who finished 25th and earned the last automatic PGA Tour card. After just missing out on a Tour card during the regular season, Oppenheim earned a PGA Tour card through the Web.com Tour Finals by just $101 over Eric Axley. The card was made possible after Lucas Glover bogeyed the 18th in the final round of the Web.com Tour Championship to finish T12 with Oppenheim, giving him just enough to earn a PGA Tour card. Oppenheim only found out when he got a phone call from the PGA Tour after he left the course, feeling dejected after thinking he just missed earning a Tour card. The 2015-16 PGA Tour season will be the first for Oppenheim after six years on the Web.com Tour.

Oppenheim didn't earn enough to retain his Tour card and ended the abbreviated Web.com Tour Finals $392 short of regaining his PGA Tour privileges.  At the 2017 AT&T Pebble Beach Pro-Am, Oppenheim shot a 9-under-par score of 278, finishing T8, and won $216,000. It was his career-best PGA Tour finish for Oppenheim, who was playing on a sponsor exemption.

Amateur wins
This list may be incomplete
2002 Massachusetts Amateur

Professional wins (10)

Web.com Tour wins (1)

Web.com Tour playoff record (0–1)

Canadian Tour wins (2)

Other wins (7)
This list may be incomplete
2004 Captain's Open (Cleveland Golf Tour)
2005 New Hampshire Open, Atkinson Open (Cleveland Golf Tour), NH Open (Cleveland Golf Tour)
2007 Greater Bangor Open
2009 Massachusetts Open, New Hampshire Open

Results in major championships

CUT = missed the half-way cut
"T" = tied

See also
2015 Web.com Tour Finals graduates
2017 Web.com Tour Finals graduates
2019 Korn Ferry Tour Finals graduates
List of Jewish golfers

References

External links

American male golfers
PGA Tour golfers
Korn Ferry Tour graduates
Golfers from Massachusetts
Golfers from Orlando, Florida
Jewish golfers
Jewish American sportspeople
Rollins Tars athletes
Sportspeople from Salem, Massachusetts
1980 births
Living people
21st-century American Jews